The 2012–13 ISU Speed Skating World Cup, officially the Essent ISU World Cup Speed Skating 2012–2013, was a series of international speed skating competitions which ran the entire season. The season started on 16 November 2012 in Heerenveen, Netherlands, and ended with the final on 10 March 2013, also in Heerenveen. In total, nine competition weekends were held at eight different locations, twelve cups were contested (six for men, and six for women), and 82 races took place.

This season world cup points was awarded in the mass start event. Additionally, the team sprint was contested as a demonstration event at both Heerenveen competitions. The World Cup is organized by the International Skating Union (ISU).

Calendar 

Note: the men's 5000 and 10000 metres were contested as one cup, and the women's 3000 and 5000 metres were contested as one cup, as indicated by the color coding.

Source: ISU

World records

World records going into the 2012–13 season.

Men

Women

At the World Cup stop in Calgary on 20 January 2013, Lee Sang-hwa of South Korea set a new world record on the women's 500 metres with a time of 36.80 seconds.

Men's standings

500 m

1000 m

1500 m

5000 and 10000 m

Mass start

Team pursuit

Women's standings

500 m

1000 m

1500 m

3000 and 5000 m

Mass start

Team pursuit

Medal table

References

External links 
International Skating Union
2011–12 ISU Speed Skating World Cup
Results at ISUresults.eu

 
12-13
Isu Speed Skating World Cup, 2012-13
Isu Speed Skating World Cup, 2012-13